Carter Brey (born 1954) is an American cello virtuoso. He had a prolific solo career from 1981 until 1996 when he became the principal cellist of the New York Philharmonic, a position he still holds today.

Biography
Carter Brey was born in Montclair, New Jersey and grew up in Westchester County, New York. He began playing the violin at age 9 and the cello at age 12 in school, although he did not seriously consider becoming a professional musician until he was 16. He studied under Laurence Lesser and Stephen Kates at Johns Hopkins University's Peabody Institute and later with Aldo Parisot at Yale University, where he was a Wardell Fellow and a Houpt Scholar. He taught at the University of South Florida in between his time at Peabody and Yale. In 1979 he joined the Cleveland Orchestra where he played for two seasons.

Brey came to international attention in 1981 when he won the 3rd Prize of the Rostropovich International Cello Competition, which led to his playing the Robert Schumann Cello concerto under the baton of Mstislav Rostropovich with the National Symphony Orchestra in 1983. In 1982 he won the Young Concert Artists International Auditions, which led to his New York City recital debut at the 92nd Street Y. These competition wins kick-started his career as a cello soloist and he has since performed with almost every major symphony orchestra in the United States under such conductors as Claudio Abbado, Lorin Maazel, Kurt Masur, Semyon Bychkov, Sergiu Comissiona, and Christoph von Dohnanyi.

As a chamber musician, Brey has performed with the Tokyo String Quartet, the Emerson String Quartet, New York Youth Symphony, and the Chamber Music Society of Lincoln Center. He has performed at the Spoleto festivals in the United States and Italy, the Santa Fe Chamber Music Festival, the La Jolla Chamber Music Festival and elsewhere.

Brey lives in New York City. He joined the faculty of the Curtis Institute of Music in 2008.

References

External links
Ovation Press,  cello scores edited by Carter Brey
Free scores Mutopia Project
Audio: Carter Brey and Christopher O'Riley, Live at NPR: Cellist and Pianist Perform, Discuss Their Music, National Public Radio, March 26, 2004
Beth Nissen Cellist Carter Brey: 'Renaissance lumber', CNN, February 23, 2001
Anne Midgette, "Cellist Returns to 1948", The New York Times,  May 3, 2003
Edward Rothstein, "Recitals: Oboist, Guitarist, and Cellist; Carter Brey, Cello, Winner of Award", The New York Times, February 8, 1984
Noah Rothbaum, "I'm a Runner: Carter Brey - This Principal Cellist with the New York Philharmonic proves that running is for everyone", Runner's World, August 2004.

1954 births
Living people
American classical cellists
Curtis Institute of Music faculty
People from Montclair, New Jersey
Yale University alumni
Peabody Institute alumni